Sheila White (born 1988) is an African-American anti–sex trafficking activist, and a former human trafficking victim herself, from The Bronx, New York City.

Background
White grew up in a dysfunctional home and, during her teen years, was placed in foster care, where she was raped. She then attempted suicide and was transferred to a psychiatric hospital. At the age of 15, she was living in a group home, where she was abused by a pimp who forced her into prostitution. While a prostitute, White was battered, raped, and branded with irons. In 2003, she was battered next to the Port Authority Bus Terminal, without anyone even asking her if she needed help.

White eventually escaped from being trafficked and went on to work with Girls Educational and Mentoring Services in order to raise awareness on the issue in New York, and President Obama recognized her work by personally giving her an award at the Clinton Global Initiative. She was interviewed in the documentary film Not My Life about her experiences while being trafficked, and said, "There is a point where you begin to feel numb. You really feel like you're not even a person." In 2013, she spoke at the Disrupting Slavery Symposium, the first symposium of the Somaly Mam Foundation, saying that "we need a platform in which a survivor has the support and comfort needed to become a leader in the field."

She has three children and attends Bronx Community College, pursuing a Bachelor's degree in social work.

See also
List of kidnappings
List of solved missing person cases

References

1988 births
2000s missing person cases
Anti–human trafficking activists
Child crime victim advocates
Sexual abuse victim advocates
Anti-pedophile activism
Anti-prostitution activists in the United States
Anti-prostitution feminists
African-American feminists
American feminists
American women's rights activists
Feminism in New York City
Forced prostitution in the United States
American victims of crime
Child prostitution in the United States
People from the Bronx
American prostitutes
Human trafficking in the United States
Kidnapped American children
City University of New York alumni
Activists from New York (state)
Victims of underage prostitution
Living people
21st-century African-American people
21st-century African-American women
20th-century African-American people